The enzyme 3-ketovalidoxylamine C-N-lyase (EC 4.3.3.1)  catalyzes the chemical reaction

4-nitrophenyl-3-ketovalidamine  4-nitroaniline + 5-D-(5/6)-5-C-(hydroxymethyl)-2,6-dihydroxycyclohex-2-en-1-one

This enzyme belongs to the family of lyases, specifically amine lyases, which cleave carbon-nitrogen bonds.  The systematic name of this enzyme class is 4-nitrophenyl-3-ketovalidamine 4-nitroaniline-lyase [5-D-(5/6)-5-C-(hydroxymethyl)-2,6-dihydroxycyclohex-2-en-1-one-forming]. Other names in common use include 3-ketovalidoxylamine A C-N-lyase, p-nitrophenyl-3-ketovalidamine p-nitroaniline lyase, and 4-nitrophenyl-3-ketovalidamine 4-nitroaniline-lyase.  It employs one cofactor, Ca2+.

References

 
 

EC 4.3.3
Calcium enzymes
Enzymes of unknown structure